The 1929 Richmond Spiders football team was an American football team that represented the University of Richmond as a member of the Virginia Conference during the 1929 college football season. Led by 16th-year head coach, Frank Dobson, Richmond compiled an overall record of 3–5–1. City Stadium opened as Richmond's new home field.

Schedule

References

Richmond
Richmond Spiders football seasons
Richmond Spiders football